Hashemiyeh Motaghian (born May 22, 1986) is an Iranian Paralympic athlete. She represented Iran at the 2020 Summer Paralympics in Tokyo, Japan and won the gold medal in the Women's javelin throw F56 event.

References

External links 
 

1986 births
Living people
Paralympic athletes of Iran
Medalists at the 2020 Summer Paralympics
Athletes (track and field) at the 2020 Summer Paralympics
Paralympic gold medalists for Iran
Paralympic medalists in athletics (track and field)
Iranian javelin throwers
People from Ahvaz
Sportspeople from Khuzestan province
Wheelchair javelin throwers
Paralympic javelin throwers
Athletes (track and field) at the 2016 Summer Paralympics
21st-century Iranian people